Kevin Grevioux (born September 9, 1962) is an American actor, screenwriter, director, and comic book writer. He is best known for his role as Raze in the Underworld film series, which he co-created, as well as his voicework in the cartoon Young Justice  as the villain Black Beetle.

Education
Grevioux graduated from Howard University in Washington, D.C. in 1987 with a degree in microbiology with minors in both chemistry and psychology, afterwards attending graduate school working towards a master's degree in genetic engineering. Grevioux began taking screenwriting and cinematography classes as well, and after his first semester of grad school had finished, he moved to Los Angeles to begin to work as a writer in earnest. He has written several spec scripts in various genres. He also started a graphic novel company called Darkstorm Comic Studios in 2003.

Career
As an actor, he has been seen in such films as The Mask, Steel, Congo, Tim Burton's Planet of the Apes remake, and the 2003 vampire vs. werewolf film, Underworld.

Underworld was Grevioux's first produced writing credit. He came up with the original concept/premise and wrote the original screenplay along with director Len Wiseman, launching the Underworld franchise. He appears in the film itself as a lycan, Raze, and returned as the character in the Underworld prequel Underworld: Rise of the Lycans, which he will also be adapting into a comic book mini-series. He has also expressed an interest in telling more Underworld stories in comic form if this proves successful.

Using Romeo and Juliet as an archetype, Grevioux based Underworld on his experiences with interracial dating and the tension that it often causes. He also brought a scientific element to the world of vampires and werewolves by basing vampirism and lycanthropy on a viral mutagen rather than the mysticism typically associated with these two mythic creatures.

Early 2006 saw Grevioux form two comic book imprints, Astounding Studios and Darkstorm Comic Studios. Grevioux's Astounding Studios imprint was to focus on all-ages titles such as Valkyries, Guardian Heroes and The Hammer Kid. The Darkstorm Studios imprint was a more mature line, including the books Alivs Rex, Skull and Guns and Uzan, The Mighty.

Grevioux's voice is distinctively deep. In the commentary track of Underworld, he relates that during the promotion and launch of the film, many fans asked him if his voice had been altered by computer, and were surprised to learn that it had not been.

Grevioux wrote Marvel Comics' New Warriors volume 4. Grevioux also wrote Adam: Legend of the Blue Marvel, introducing Blue Marvel, a character he'd created in his teens. The miniseries was drawn by Mat Broome and Roberto Castro. He is also in the process of writing a story featuring Lee Falk's characters The Phantom and Mandrake the Magician, co-written with Mike Bullock. He also wrote ZMD: Zombies of Mass Destruction for Red 5 Comics.

On December 2, 2009, Grevioux hosted a pilot episode for a concept series, Monster Tracker, on Discovery Channel.

He sold the original screenplay for the film adaptation of his Darkstorm Comics Studios graphic novel, I, Frankenstein, to Lakeshore Entertainment, which also produced the Underworld films. The story follows the original monster of Victor Frankenstein who is the only force that stands between the human race and an uprising of supernatural creatures determined to overthrow the world. Filming began on February 27, 2012, and the film was released in January 2014.

Since November 6, 2017, Line Webtoon has been publishing Brothers Bond, an action webcomic collaboration with Ryan Benjamin in which they were both nominated for the esteemed Eisner Award for Best Webcomic.

In 2019, Grevioux portrayed The Vault Keeper in "EC Comics Presents The Vault of Horror", a full-cast audio drama adapting the first 24 stories from the first six issues of the original EC comic series.

In 2022, Grevioux directed, wrote, and produced the action film King of Killers, starring Alain Moussi and Frank Grillo, through his production company Channel 56 Films. It was based on his Darkstorm graphic novel.

Grevioux is an avid NFL fan. His favorite team is the Minnesota Vikings.

Filmography

Film

Television

Video games

Bibliography
 New Warriors (Marvel Comics)
 ZMD: Zombies of Mass Destruction (Red 5 Comics, forthcoming)
 Adam: Legend of the Blue Marvel (with Mat Broome, 5-issue limited series, Marvel Comics, January–May 2009)
 Underworld: Rise of the Lycans (with Andrew Huerta, 2-issue mini-series, IDW Publishing, forthcoming)
 Odyssey of the Amazons (DC Comics, 6-issue limited series, 2017)
 Rise of the Djinn (Zenescope Entertainment and Darkstorm Comics, 3-issue limited series, 2021)

References

External links
Official website

Kevin Grevioux at ComicSpace
Astounding Comics
Darkstorm Studios
Darkstorm Comics

Living people
Male actors from Illinois
African-American male actors
African-American screenwriters
African-American film directors
Screenwriters from Illinois
American science fiction writers
American comics writers
American male film actors
American male screenwriters
American stunt performers
American male voice actors
Howard University alumni
Marvel Comics people
Marvel Comics writers
DC Comics people
Writers from Chicago
1962 births
21st-century African-American people
20th-century African-American people
African-American male writers